Dianne Roberta Gerace (born October 26, 1943) is a retired track athlete from Canada. She competed at the 1964 Summer Olympics in the high jump and pentathlon and finished in 5th and 15th place, respectively. She won a silver medal in the high jump and finished sixth in the long jump at the 1963 Pan American Games. She is of Italian and Scottish descent.

Gerace is married to Ulrick Fox Sr. They have a son, the actor and NBA player Rick Fox, and two daughters, model and actress Jeanene Fox and artist and art curator Sarah Fox.

References

1943 births
Athletes (track and field) at the 1963 Pan American Games
Athletes (track and field) at the 1964 Summer Olympics
Canadian female high jumpers
Canadian female long jumpers
Canadian pentathletes
Living people
Olympic track and field athletes of Canada
Pan American Games silver medalists for Canada
Pan American Games medalists in athletics (track and field)
Sportspeople from Trail, British Columbia
Sportspeople from British Columbia
Canadian people of Italian descent
Canadian people of Scottish descent
Medalists at the 1963 Pan American Games